Events in the year 1957 in Japan. It corresponds to Shōwa 32 (昭和32年)) in the Japanese calendar.

Incumbents
 Emperor: Hirohito
 Prime Minister: Tanzan Ishibashi (until 31 January), then Kishi Nobusuke

Governors
Aichi Prefecture: Mikine Kuwahara 
Akita Prefecture: Yūjirō Obata 
Aomori Prefecture: Iwao Yamazaki 
Chiba Prefecture: Hitoshi Shibata 
Ehime Prefecture: Sadatake Hisamatsu 
Fukui Prefecture: Seiichi Hane 
Fukuoka Prefecture: Taichi Uzaki
Fukushima Prefecture: Sakuma Ootake (until 25 July); Zenichiro Satō (starting 25 August)
Gifu Prefecture: Kamon Muto 
Gunma Prefecture: Toshizo Takekoshi 
Hiroshima Prefecture: Hiroo Ōhara 
Hokkaido: Toshifumi Tanaka 
Hyogo Prefecture: Masaru Sakamoto 
Ibaraki Prefecture: Yoji Tomosue 
Ishikawa Prefecture: Jūjitsu Taya 
Iwate Prefecture: Senichi Abe 
Kagawa Prefecture: Masanori Kaneko 
Kagoshima Prefecture: Katsushi Terazono 
Kanagawa Prefecture: Iwataro Uchiyama 
Kochi Prefecture: Masumi Mizobuchi 
Kumamoto Prefecture: Saburō Sakurai 
Kyoto Prefecture: Torazō Ninagawa 
Mie Prefecture: Satoru Tanaka 
Miyagi Prefecture: Yasushi Onuma 
Miyazaki Prefecture: Jingo Futami 
Nagano Prefecture: Torao Hayashi 
Nagasaki Prefecture: Takejirō Nishioka 
Nara Prefecture: Ryozo Okuda 
Niigata Prefecture: Kazuo Kitamura
Oita Prefecture: Kaoru Kinoshita 
Okayama Prefecture: Yukiharu Miki 
Osaka Prefecture: Bunzō Akama 
Saga Prefecture: Naotsugu Nabeshima 
Saitama Prefecture: Hiroshi Kurihara 
Shiga Prefecture: Kotaro Mori 
Shiname Prefecture: Yasuo Tsunematsu 
Shizuoka Prefecture: Toshio Saitō 
Tochigi Prefecture: Kiichi Ogawa 
Tokushima Prefecture: Kikutaro Hara 
Tokyo: Seiichirō Yasui 
Tottori Prefecture: Shigeru Endo 
Toyama Prefecture: Minoru Yoshida 
Wakayama Prefecture: Shinji Ono 
Yamagata Prefecture: Tōkichi Abiko 
Yamaguchi Prefecture: Taro Ozawa 
Yamanashi Prefecture: Hisashi Amano

Events
 April 1 – Yoyogi Seminar Cram School was founded.
 April 12 - According to Japan Coast Guard official confirmed report, a sightseeing boat Kitagawa Maru No 5 capsize by overcrowded off Onomichi, Hiroshima Prefecture, 113 persons perished, with 49 persons wounded.
 May 8 - Coca-Cola, full-scale sale start in Japan.
 June 20 – Toru Takemitsu's Requiem for Strings is first performed, by the Tokyo Symphony Orchestra.
 July 25–28 - According to Japanese government official confirmed report, heavy massive torrential rain and flood swept hit around Isahaya, Kyushu Island. 992 persons lost their lives in mudslides and flooding.
 November 15 - A first section Nagoya to Sakae of Nagoya Municipal Subway Higashiyama Line operation started in Aichi Prefecture.

Births
January 18 – Yōko Akino, actress
January 19 – Fumi Saimon, comic artist
February 4 – Shigeru Ishiba, politician
March 8 – Mitsuko Horie, voice actress and singer
March 10 – Yoshitaka Katori, former professional baseball pitcher
March 13 – Yoshihiko Takahashi, former professional baseball pitcher   
May 8 – Rino Katase, actress
May 20 – Yoshihiko Noda,  politician and Prime Minister of Japan
May 22 – Shinji Morisue, gymnast
June 1 – Yasuhiro Yamashita, chairman of Japan Olympic Comnitee and former judo-ka 
June 10 – Hidetsugu Aneha, architect
June 24 – Hiroshi Ono, video game artist (d. 2021)
July 12 – Kazunori Shinozuka, former professional baseball player
July 17 – Shinobu Ōtake, actress  
July 29 – Fumio Kishida, 100th Prime Minister of Japan
August 29 – Shirō Sagisu, composer
September 12 – Keiko Toda voice actress
September 16 – Hideo Higashikokubaru, former governor of Miyazaki Prefecture and comedian  
October 10 – Rumiko Takahashi, manga artist
October 16 – Tsuneyuki Nakajima, golfer
October 25 – Atsushi Ōnita, politician and former wrestler
October 30 – Jackie Sato, professional wrestler (d. 1999)
November 25 – Akinobu Okada, former baseball manager and player 
December 15 – Chō, voice actor
December 17 – Masako Natsume, actress (d. 1985)
December 19 – Jūrōta Kosugi, voice actor

Deaths
January 18 – Tomitaro Makino, pioneering botanist (b. 1862)
January 25
Ichizō Kobayashi, businessman, founded Hankyu Hanshin Holdings (b. 1873)
Kiyoshi Shiga, physician and bacteriologist (b. 1871)
January 26 – Mamoru Shigemitsu, diplomat and politician (b. 1887)
September 22 – Toyoda Soemu, Japanese admiral (b. 1885)

References

 
1950s in Japan
Japan
Years of the 20th century in Japan